The 2018 Moselle Open was a men's tennis tournament held in Metz, France and played on indoor hard courts. It was the 16th edition of the Moselle Open, and part of the ATP World Tour 250 series of the 2018 ATP World Tour. It was held at the Arènes de Metz from 17 September to 23 September 2018. Unseeded Gilles Simon won the singles title.

Singles main-draw entrants

Seeds

 1 Rankings are as of September 10, 2018.

Other entrants 
The following players received wild cards into the singles main draw:
  Quentin Halys
  Ugo Humbert
  Corentin Moutet

The following players received entry from the singles qualifying draw:
  Matthias Bachinger
  Constant Lestienne
  Kenny de Schepper
  Bernard Tomic

The following player received entry as a lucky loser:
  Grégoire Barrère
  Yannick Maden

Withdrawals 
Before the tournament
  Marius Copil → replaced by  Jürgen Zopp
  Philipp Kohlschreiber → replaced by  Yannick Maden
  Lucas Pouille → replaced by  Grégoire Barrère

Doubles main-draw entrants

Seeds 

 Rankings are as of September 10, 2018

Other entrants 
The following pairs received wildcards into the doubles main draw:
  Jo-Wilfried Tsonga /  Ugo Humbert 
  Lucas Pouille /  Grégoire Barrère

The following pair received entry as alternates:
  Sander Arends /  Romain Arneodo

Withdrawals 
Before the tournament
  Mischa Zverev

Champions

Singles 

   Gilles Simon def.  Matthias Bachinger, 7–6(7–2), 6–1.

Doubles 

  Nicolas Mahut /  Édouard Roger-Vasselin def.  Ken Skupski /  Neal Skupski 6–1, 7–5.

References

External links
Official Website

 
September 2018 sports events in France